Prince Alexander Mikhailovich Gorchakov (Russian: Алекса́ндр Миха́йлович Горчако́в; 15 July 179811 March 1883) was a Russian diplomat and statesman from the Gorchakov princely family. He has an enduring reputation as one of the most influential and respected diplomats of the mid-19th century. Scholars agree that the termination of the demilitarisation of the Black Sea was Gorchakov's greatest accomplishment but add that he stayed too long as foreign minister.

Early life and career 
Gorchakov was born at Haapsalu, Governorate of Estonia, and was educated at the Tsarskoye Selo Lyceum, where he had the poet Alexander Pushkin as a school-fellow. He became a good classical scholar, and learned to speak and write in French with facility and elegance. Pushkin in one of his poems described young Gorchakov as Fortune's favoured son, and predicted his success.

On leaving the lyceum Gorchakov entered the foreign office under Count Nesselrode. His first diplomatic work of importance was the negotiation of a marriage between the grand duchess Olga and the crown prince Charles of Wurttemberg. He remained at Stuttgart for some years as Russian minister and confidential adviser of the crown princess. He foretold the outbreak of the revolutionary spirit in Germany and Austria, and was credited with counselling the abdication of Ferdinand in favour of Francis Joseph. When the German Confederation was re-established in 1850 in place of the parliament of Frankfurt, Gorchakov was appointed Russian minister to the diet. It was here that he first met Prince Bismarck, with whom he formed a friendship which was afterwards renewed at St Petersburg.

The emperor Nicholas found that his ambassador at Vienna, Baron Meyendorff, was not a sympathetic instrument for carrying out his schemes in the East. He therefore transferred Gorchakov to Vienna, where the latter remained through the critical period of the Crimean War. Gorchakov perceived that Russian designs against Turkey, which was supported by Britain and France, were impracticable, and he counselled Russia to make no more useless sacrifices, but to accept the basis of a pacification. At the same time, although he attended the Paris conference of 1856, he purposely abstained from affixing his signature to the treaty of peace after that of Count Orlov, Russia's chief representative. For the time, however, he made a virtue of necessity, and Alexander II, recognising the wisdom and courage which Gorchakov had exhibited, appointed him minister of foreign affairs in place of Count Nesselrode.

Minister of foreign affairs 
Not long after his accession to office, Gorchakov issued a circular to the foreign powers in which he announced that Russia proposed, for internal reasons, to keep herself as free as possible from complications abroad, and he added the now-historic phrase, La Russie ne boude pas; elle se recueille ('Russia is not sulking, she is composing herself'). During the January Uprising in Poland, Gorchakov rebuffed the suggestions of Britain, Austria and France for assuaging the severities employed in quelling it, and he was especially acrid in his replies to Earl Russell's despatches. The Prussian support was assured by the Alvensleben Convention. In July 1863 Gorchakov was appointed Chancellor of the Russian Empire, expressly in reward for his bold diplomatic attitude towards an indignant Europe. The appointment was hailed with enthusiasm in Russia.

A rapprochement now began between the courts of Russia and Prussia, and in 1863, Gorchakov smoothed the way for the occupation of Holstein by German troops. That seemed equally favourable to Austria and Prussia, but it was the latter power that gained all the substantial advantages. When conflict arose between Austria and Prussia in 1866, Russia remained neutral and permitted Prussia to reap the benefits arising from the conflict and establish its supremacy in Germany.

In 1867 Russia and the United States concluded the sale of Alaska, a process which had begun as early as 1854 during the Crimean War. Gorchakov was not against the sale but always advocated for careful and secret negotiations and saw the eventuality of the sale but not the immediate necessity.

When the Franco-German War of 1870-1871 broke out, Russia argued for the neutrality of Austria. An attempt was made to form an anti-Prussian coalition, but it failed because of the cordial understanding between the German and the Russian chancellors.

In return for Russia's service in preventing Austrian support being given to France, Gorchakov looked to Bismarck for diplomatic support on the Eastern Question, and he received an instalment of the expected support when he successfully denounced the Black Sea clauses of the Treaty of Paris (Treaty of London (1871)). That was justly regarded by him as an important service to his country and one of the triumphs of his career, and he hoped to obtain further successes with the assistance of Germany. However, the cordial relations between the cabinets of Saint Petersburg and Berlin did not last much longer.

In 1875, Bismarck was suspected of having designs to again attack France, and Gorchakov let him know in a way that was not meant to be offensive but roused Bismarck's indignation that Russia would oppose any such scheme. The tension thus produced between the two statesmen was increased by the political complications of 1875–1878 in Southeastern Europe, which began with the Herzegovian insurrection and culminated at the Congress of Berlin. Gorchakov hoped to use the complications of the situation in such a way as to recover, without war, the portion of Bessarabia ceded by the treaty of Paris, but he soon lost control of events, and the Slavophile agitation produced the Russo-Turkish campaign of 1877-78.

The Peace of San Stefano, drafted by Gorchakov, Alexander Nelidov, and Nikolai Ignatiev, redrew Ottoman boundaries to further Russia's economic and strategic plans. A key goal was control of the port city of Batumi on the eastern shore of the Black Sea, in addition to several strategic points in the Caucasus. Most importantly, Bulgaria was greatly enlarged to serve as the dominant power in the Balkans and be under Russian control. France, Germany and Austria objected and radically reduced Russia's gains at the Berlin Congress (13 June to 13 July 1878). Gorchakov was honored as first plenipotentiary, but he left to the second plenipotentiary, Count Shuvalov, not only the task of defending Russian interests but also the responsibility and odium for the concessions which Russia had to make to Britain and Austria. He had the satisfaction of seeing the lost portion of Bessarabia restored to Russia but at the cost of greater sacrifices than he anticipated. On the whole Russia was humiliated again. Gorchakov considered the treaty the greatest failure of his official career. He continued to hold the post of foreign minister but lived chiefly abroad, with Dmitry Milyutin taking responsibility for foreign affairs.

Later life
Gorchakov resigned formally in 1882 and was succeeded by Nicholas de Giers. He died at Baden-Baden and was buried at the family vault in Strelna Monastery.

Assessment 
Prince Gorchakov devoted himself mostly to foreign affairs but also took some part in the great internal reforms of Alexander II's reign: for example he submitted four projects of emancipation reform and also presented to analysis of the foreign experience of various reforms to Alexander II.

As a diplomat, he displayed many brilliant qualities: adroitness in negotiation, incisiveness in argument and elegance in style. His statesmanship, though marred occasionally by personal vanity and love of popular applause, was far-seeing and prudent. In the latter part of his career, his main object was to raise the prestige of Russia by undoing the results of the Crimean War, and it may fairly be said that he greatly succeeded.

Honours 
 : Grand Cross of the Royal Hungarian Order of Saint Stephen, 1857; in Diamonds, 1872
 : Knight of the House Order of Fidelity, 1857; in Diamonds, 1863
 :
 Grand Cross of the Order of the Dannebrog, 8 July 1852
 Knight of the Order of the Elephant, 16 September 1857
 : Grand Cross of the Ludwig Order, 2 July 1857
  Mexican Empire: Grand Cross of the Imperial Order of Guadalupe, 1864
 : Knight of the Order of the Gold Lion of the House of Nassau, August 1864
  Kingdom of Prussia: Knight of the Order of the Black Eagle, 24 June 1856; in Diamonds, 1859
  Kingdom of Sardinia: Knight of the Supreme Order of the Most Holy Annunciation, 30 October 1859
 : Knight of the Order of the Golden Fleece, 17 February 1857
   Sweden-Norway: Knight of the Royal Order of the Seraphim, 16 May 1860
  Grand Duchy of Tuscany: Commander of the Order of Saint Joseph
 : Knight of the Order of Saint Januarius, 1845
 : Grand Cross of the Order of the Württemberg Crown, 1846

See also
 Internationalization of the Danube River

References

Bibliography 
 Clark, Chester W. "Prince Gorchakov and the Black Sea Question, 1866 A Russian Bomb that did not Explode." American Historical Review (1942) 48#1: 52–60. online
  Golicz, Roman, "The Russians shall not have Constantinople: English Attitudes to Russia, 1870–1878", History Today (November 2003) 53#9 pp 39–45.
 Hauner, Milan. "Central Asian geopolitics in the last hundred years: a critical survey from Gorchakov to Gorbachev." Central Asian Survey 8.1 (1989): 1–19.
 Jelavich, Barbara. St. Petersburg and Moscow: Tsarist and Soviet Foreign Policy, 1814–1974 (1974), pp 133–91.
 Meyendorff, Alfred. "Conversations of Gorchakov with Andrássy and Bismarck in 1872." The Slavonic and East European Review 8.23 (1929): 400–408. online
 Saul, Norman E. Distant Friends: The United States and Russia, 1763-1867 (UP of Kansas, 1991).
 Seton-Watson, Hugh. The Russian Empire 1801–1917 (1967) 
 Splidsboel-Hansen, Flemming. "Past and future meet: Aleksandr Gorchakov and Russian foreign policy." Europe-Asia Studies 54.3 (2002): 377–396. online
 Stevens, John Knox. "The Franco-Russian Treaty of 1859: New Light and New Thoughts." Historian 28.2 (1966): 203–223. online

External links
 Digitized page images
 English translation

1798 births
1883 deaths
People from Haapsalu
People from the Governorate of Estonia
Foreign ministers of the Russian Empire
Chancellors of the Russian Empire
Russian people of the Crimean War
Russian people of the Russo-Turkish War (1877–1878)
Alexander Mikhailovich
Diplomats of the Russian Empire
Ambassadors of the Russian Empire to Austria
Members of the State Council (Russian Empire)
Honorary members of the Saint Petersburg Academy of Sciences
Tsarskoye Selo Lyceum alumni
19th-century politicians from the Russian Empire
Knights of the Golden Fleece of Spain
Grand Crosses of the Order of Saint Stephen of Hungary
Grand Crosses of the Order of the Dannebrog
Knights Commander of the Order of Saint Joseph